Anton Yasynskiy (30 November 1911 – 1994) was a Soviet sports shooter. He competed in the 50 metre pistol event at the 1956 Summer Olympics.

References

1911 births
1994 deaths
Soviet male sport shooters
Olympic shooters of the Soviet Union
Shooters at the 1956 Summer Olympics
Sportspeople from Vinnytsia